Bynon Hill is an ice-covered, dome-shaped hill with two rounded summits,  high, standing  north of Pendulum Cove, Deception Island, in the South Shetland Islands. The name appears on an Argentine government chart of 1953.

References 

Hills of the South Shetland Islands
Geography of Deception Island